The Ermita de San Pelayo y San Isidoro (English: Hermitage of Saint Pelagius and Saint Isidore) is a ruined Romanesque church, originally in the city of Ávila, Spain. It was built outside the city walls, in front to the Gate of Malaventura in the south side of the Walls. In Ávila, there remains an area known as the Atrium of San Isidro. After the Spanish confiscation, it was moved to Madrid, where it had different locations. Its remains finally found accommodation in the Buen Retiro Park in central Madrid.

History 
Its first patronage was to the Córdoban child martyr, Pelagius, and thus is cited in a document of the year 1250, in which it says that the church was exempt of tax. Moreover, there is a text of consecration carved on a tombstone dated to the year 1270.

Historians who have studied this tombstone assume that this might refer to a second consecration of the church, when the dedication of Saint Pelagius was changed to Saint Isidore. After this, there have not come to light more documents that would inform the development and evolution of the small temple until 19th century, thanks to the book of the Cofraternity of San Isidro which was discovered in the sacristy of the church of San Nicolás in Ávila.

Also is cited that before the patronage that this hermitage had inside the Saint Isidore's saint's relics before being transferred to León in 1062.

Also are known through the documents of the Archives of Ávila, the Academy of Fine Arts and the General Archive of the Administration of Alcalá de Henares, the circumstances of its transfer to Madrid after the Spanish Confiscation.

 Confiscation and move to Madrid

In the 19th century the church belonged to the Asociación de Labradores (Association of Farm workers); it must be then when changed its patronage to Saint Isidore. Around 1854 the building was badly damaged and the City Council ordered to the Association its demolition. At the same time, the Association offered the temple to the City Council but was not accepted, so they prepared to carry out the required work of demolition. But passed a years without doing anything until in 1876 the State applied the law of Confiscation, demolishing in 1877 to sell the remains of the demolition to individuals. That was how a neighbor of Ávila bought most of the stones; Emiliano Rotondo Nicolau -engineer and businessman with interests of archaeologist, resident in Madrid- bought the rest of the ashlars and architectural elements. After a failed attempt of sell to the City Hall of San Sebastian, Rotondo Nicolau could sell the ruins to the Real Academia de la Historia in 1893 for 18.000 pesetas. The new location of the church was in the gardens of the Museo Arqueológico and its fate would, besides of show it as relic of the Romanesque, use as a chapel where is to give Mass with the Mozarabic Rite every Sunday.

But all just was a project until Cánovas del Castillo in 1897 it interested in the monument and the museum it ceded to City Hall of Madrid ordering its transfer to the Buen Retiro Park under the supervision and project of the architect Ricardo Velázquez Bosco. The location, next to the intersection of O 'Donnell with Menéndez Pelayo, very close to the Montaña Artificial, is pleasant, surrounded by greenery and centenary trees and could have been a ruins to the romantic taste, but the building suffered another forgotten and abandoned. Finally at the beginning of 21st century City Council of Madrid sent to tidy the place recovering stones, capitals, shafts, cornices, etc. that were scattered in the environment.

Building description
 
The hermitage was made in rectangular ashlars of limestone. It was a temple of unique nave with wood cover. The head was semicircular with semi-dome, and straight section with barrel vault in turn divided into two parts. Both the architectural structure of the head as the decorative motifs that can be seen in the drawings of Van den Wyngaerde, Repullés and Francisco Aznar link this building with San Vicente, San Pedro and San Andrés of Ávila, so the date of construction can approach that of those temples, the mid-12th century.

In the unique nave it opened two doors, one to south and one to the west (puerta de los pies); still the remains of one of the two in which it can see the three midpoint archivolts that support in the abacuses united to impost. Although almost not noted, this impost is carved with roses of four petals inscribed in circles. The same rosettes formed  the decoration carved of the archivolts; yet it can guess its trace. The capitals had a zoomorphic and vegetal decoration. Despite the deterioration it can still see the acanthus leaves.

In the apse it opened three semicircular windows with archivolt and chambrana. Remain two as witness and in its it can distinguish the deep flare ending in narrow arrowslit. The archivolts rest on abacuses and capitals that were decorated with leaves and birds with the beak between the legs, like those that can be seen in the Iglesia de San Andrés of Ávila. According to the preserved drawings, in the straight section had blind arches of a single arch whose capitals were decorated with plant motifs, lions and birds. The study of this decoration has suggested in the workshops that carved San Pedro and San Vicente and the covers of San Andrés.

See also 
 Romanesque architecture in Spain

References

Works cited
 

Demolished buildings and structures in Spain
Romanesque architecture in Castile and León
Romanesque architecture in Madrid
12th-century churches in Spain
Church ruins in Spain
Ruins in Madrid
Buildings and structures demolished in the 19th century